This is a list of the most populous civil parishes in England. It includes all civil parishes with populations over 30,000, representing less than 1% of all civil parishes but almost 3% of the population.

Lichfield, Hereford and Salisbury are in addition to being some of the most populous civil parishes in England, among the smallest cities.

Many large parishes have been created during the 21st century, due in part to new procedures making their creation easier, and also the ongoing creation of large unitary authorities, which has led to the desire to retain a more local tier of government.

In 2020, Northampton became the largest civil parish in England due to local government reorganisation in 2021 which saw it become part of the larger West Northamptonshire unitary authority.

References 

Civil parishes in England
England, Civil parishes
United Kingdom-related lists of superlatives
Civil parishes